The 2021 Lima Challenger was a professional tennis tournament played on clay courts. It was the fifteenth edition of the tournament which was part of the 2021 ATP Challenger Tour. It took place in Lima, Peru between 27 September and 3 October 2021.

Singles main-draw entrants

Seeds

 1 Rankings are as of 20 September 2021.

Other entrants
The following players received wildcards into the singles main draw:
  Gonzalo Bueno
  Conner Huertas del Pino
  Gonzalo Lama

The following player received entry into the singles main draw using a protected ranking:
  Gerald Melzer

The following players received entry into the singles main draw as alternates:
  Nicolás Álvarez
  Oriol Roca Batalla

The following players received entry from the qualifying draw:
  Nicolás Barrientos
  Carlos Gómez-Herrera
  Johan Nikles
  Jorge Panta

Champions

Singles

  Hugo Dellien def.  Camilo Ugo Carabelli 6–3, 7–5.

Doubles

  Julian Lenz /  Gerald Melzer def.  Nicolás Barrientos /  Fernando Romboli 7–6(7–4), 7–6(7–3).

References

2021 ATP Challenger Tour
2021
September 2021 sports events in South America
October 2021 sports events in South America
2021 in Peruvian sport